Dizy is a commune in the Marne department in north-eastern France.

Geography
Dizy is situated in the Marne valley, on the main road between Épernay (3 km) and Reims (23 km).

The village is north of Magenta, south of Champillon, east of Hautvillers and west of Ay.

History
In 1881, the commune which was called Dizy until 1801, then Dizy-sur-Marne, took the name of Dizy-Magenta. In 1965, when Magenta became independent, the village took again the name of Dizy.

Demographics
The inhabitants of the commune are called Dizyciens.

Twin towns
Dizy is twinned with:
 Sommerach, Germany

See also
Communes of the Marne department
Montagne de Reims Regional Natural Park

References

Communes of Marne (department)